Pseudocoremia ombrodes is a species of moth in the family Geometridae. It is endemic to New Zealand.

References 

Boarmiini
Moths of New Zealand
Endemic fauna of New Zealand
Moths described in 1902
Taxa named by Edward Meyrick
Endemic moths of New Zealand